Robert Samuel Fields (born 10 July 1934) is an American actor who has appeared in film and television.  A life member of The Actors Studio, Fields is known for his role as Daniel in the 1987 drama film Anna.

Early life and education
Fields was born to Mr. and Mrs. Lee Fields of Brookline, Massachusetts.  His father was a restaurateur.

Fields graduated from Carnegie Mellon University and Neighborhood Playhouse School of the Theatre.

Career
Fields appeared with Steve McQueen in the 1958 science fiction horror film The Blob (1958), playing Tony Gressette.  It was Fields' film debut.  He later provided commentary in 2000, when the film was released on DVD by The Criterion Collection.

He played Joel in the 1969 film They Shoot Horses, Don't They? (1969).

Fields portrayed the character Will in the 1970 film Cover Me Babe.

Fields also co-starred with Sally Kirkland in Anna (1987).

One of his final performances to date was as Jay Smiley in The Souler Opposite (1998).

Personal life
On June 26, 1983, Fields married Betty-Jane Robbins, then a marketing director for trade books at Harcourt Brace Jovanovich in San Diego, at the Fairview Country Club in Greenwich, Connecticut.  Their wedding was performed by Rabbi H. Leonard Poller.

Fields was a friend of The Blob (1958) co-star Steve McQueen.

Selected filmography

The Blob (1958) as Tony Gressette
Frankenstein Meets the Space Monster (1965) as Reporter (uncredited)
The Incident (1967) as Kenneth Otis
They Shoot Horses, Don't They? (1969) as Joel
Cover Me Babe (1970) as Will
The Sporting Club (1971) as Vernur Stanton
Rhinoceros (1974) as Young Man
The Stepford Wives (1975) as Raymond Chandler
Looking for Mr. Goodbar (1977) as Rafe (uncredited)
A Secret Space (1977) as Eli
Night-Flowers (1979) as Trasker
Jet Lag (1981) as Tom
Star 80 (1983) as Director
Anna (1987) as Daniel
Miami Vice Episode 5x15 "Over the Line " (1989)
Getting Away with Murder (1996) as Sergeant Roarke
American Strays (1996) as Harry
The Souler Opposite (1998) as Jay Smiley
Charades (1998) as Paul Curtiss
Little Dreams (2002) as Will Peterson (final film role)

References

External links

1934 births
American male film actors
American male stage actors
American male television actors
Living people
Male actors from Boston